Park Jong-woo (born April 11, 1979) is a South Korean football player who is currently a free agent.

He formerly played for Gyeongnam FC, Chunnam Dragons and Gwangju Sangmu Phoenix.

Club career statistics

External links

1979 births
Living people
Association football midfielders
South Korean footballers
Jeonnam Dragons players
Gimcheon Sangmu FC players
Gyeongnam FC players
Yanbian Funde F.C. players
China League One players
K League 1 players
Korea National League players
Expatriate footballers in China
South Korean expatriate sportspeople in China